Your Little Secret is the fifth studio album by singer-songwriter Melissa Etheridge, released in 1995. It was her most successful album on the Billboard 200, where it peaked at number six. The album also contained three singles, "Your Little Secret", "I Want to Come Over", and "Nowhere to Go". "I Want to Come Over" went on to reach  22 on the Billboard Hot 100, and "Nowhere to Go" peaked at No. 40. As of 2010, the album has sold 1,348,000 copies in the United States alone, according to Nielsen SoundScan.

Track listing
All songs by Melissa Etheridge, except where noted
"Your Little Secret" – 4:19
"I Really Like You" – 4:09
"Nowhere to Go" – 5:53
"An Unusual Kiss" – 5:21
"I Want to Come Over" – 5:25
"All the Way to Heaven" – 4:54
"I Could Have Been You" (Etheridge, John Shanks) – 5:56
"Shriner's Park" – 5:23
"Change" – 4:37
"This War Is Over" – 6:57

Limited edition 2CD set includes 4 track live CD

"Come to My Window" – 4:01
"No Souvenirs" – 5:00
"Ain't It Heavy" – 4:20
"Yes I Am" – 4:23

Personnel
Melissa Etheridge – acoustic guitar, electric guitar, keyboards, vocals
John Shanks – acoustic guitar, electric guitar, keyboards
Mark Browne – bass guitar
Kenny Aronoff, Dave Beyer – drums

Production
Producers: Melissa Etheridge, Hugh Padgham
Engineers: Greg Goldman, Hugh Padgham
Assistant engineer: John Aguto
Mastering: Bob Ludwig
Post production: Cheryl Engels
Art direction: Judy Troilo

Charts

Weekly charts

Year-end charts

Singles – Billboard (North America)

Certifications

References

Melissa Etheridge albums
1995 albums
Albums produced by Hugh Padgham
Island Records albums